The Middle Passage: The Caribbean Revisited is a 1962 book-length essay and travelogue by V. S. Naipaul. It is his first book-length work of non-fiction.

The book covers a year-long trip Naipaul took through Trinidad, British Guiana, Suriname, Martinique, and Jamaica in 1961. As well as giving his own impressions, Naipaul refers to the work of earlier travellers such as Patrick Leigh Fermor, who described a similar itinerary in The Traveller's Tree (1950). Naipaul addresses a range of topics including the legacy of slavery and colonialism, race relations, the roles of immigrants from India in the various countries, and differences in language, culture, and economics.

The book was poorly received in Trinidad and other Caribbean nations on account of Naipaul's "patronising attitude" towards these colonies and ex-colonies, his apparent approval of imperialism, and for other reasons.

SEE https://www.bbc.co.uk/programmes/m000bpkt

Notes

1961 non-fiction books
British travel books
Books by V. S. Naipaul
Books about the Caribbean
Macmillan Publishers books
English non-fiction books